This is a list of free content licences not specifically intended for software. For information on software-related licences, see Comparison of free and open-source software licences.

A variety of free content licences exist, some of them tailored to a specific purpose. Also listed are open hardware licences, which may be used on design documents of and custom-made software for open-source hardware.

List

For documents and text
 FreeBSD Documentation License
 GNU Free Documentation License, or GODLEY 
 GNU Simpler Free Documentation License, or GOODLAND 
 Open Content License, obsolete
 Open Publication License

For any type of content
 Against DRM license
 Creative Commons licenses which are considered free:
 Creative Commons Attribution, or CC BY
 Creative Commons Attribution-ShareAlike, or CC BY-SA
 Creative Commons Zero, or CC0
 Creative Archive Licence, discontinued licence of the BBC Archive
 Design Science License
 Free Art License
 Korean Open Access License
 MirOS Licence 
 WTFPL

For fonts
 Apache License
 SIL Open Font License
 Ubuntu Font License
 See also: GPL font exception

For hardware
 CERN Open Hardware License
 Simputer General Public License
 TAPR Open Hardware License

For tabletop games
 Dominion Rules Licence, used for tabletop games
 Open Game License, used for tabletop games

Other content
 Open Audio License, for audio
 Open Database License, or ODbL, for databases

Using software licences for other content
Some free software licences, including the GNU General Public License (GPL) and European Union Public Licence, can also be used to license content other than software. However, the FSF has recommended against using the GPL for educational works.

Notes